Brett Haley (born ) is an American filmmaker and actor best known for his work on The Hero and Hearts Beat Loud.

Early life 
Haley was born in Illinois and raised in Key West, Florida and Pensacola, Florida. Haley developed an interest in filmmaking from childhood, making films with a VHS camera from age 9, recalling, "From a young age, I was a storyteller. I just knew it was what I wanted to do". Haley credits his older brother, Joshua Ferris, for introducing him to movies like True Romance and Angel Heart. He was also influenced by 80s and 90s action movies, such as Alien, Terminator and Die Hard through his childhood.

Education 
Haley began his formal filmmaking education at the University of North Carolina School of the Arts School of Filmmaking in 2001, with a concentration in directing. He worked toward making a feature every summer, working with fellow UNCSA students to make up his crew. Of his time as a student, he says, "I learned a lot about what it means to be a collaborator at UNCSA. You learn quickly that film is very collaborative." Upon graduating in 2005, he moved to Los Angeles to work as a production assistant, but quickly relocated to Brooklyn when he realized that approach wasn't for him.

Career 

Haley's first feature film, The New Year, was co-written with his sister-in-law, novelist Elizabeth Kennedy, and made for $5,000. Although he considers himself a director first and foremost, Haley says, "I learned very young that if I wanted to make independent films and get those films off the ground, then I needed to be a writer. For me, it was important to start writing and discover: what am I going to write about? How am I going to write it?...That’s when I learned that I needed a writing partner. I write better with a partner and highly recommend that to those who are struggling". The New Year premiered at the Sarasota Film Festival in 2010 and won the Audience Award for Best Narrative Film.

In 2015, he co-wrote, edited, and directed I'll See You in My Dreams. Marc Basch was his co-writer. It premiered at the 2015 Sundance Film Festival, and went on to win awards for Best Actress and Best Director at the Louisiana Film Festival. Additionally, Blythe Danner was nominated for the Best Actress Award at the Gotham Awards for her role. In an interview, Sam Elliott says he "jumped at the chance to play a romantic lead"; "it's always been what's on the page for me," says Elliott. "I don't know how this kid came up with such a gem about 70-year-olds at 29, or whatever he was when he wrote it."

Haley and his co-writer, Marc Basch, wrote The Hero specifically for Sam Elliott, who starred alongside Blythe Danner in I'll See You in My Dreams. Haley describes The Hero as his love letter to Elliott, saying that "Sam is the best. He is a true collaborator and an incredible actor and human being. He is so passionate about his work and, in my mind, he is an icon."  The Hero also stars Laura Prepon, Nick Offerman, Katharine Ross and Krysten Ritter, and premiered in the U.S. Dramatic Competition category at the 2017 Sundance Film Festival. It was released in the U.S. by The Orchard in June 2017.

He co-wrote and directed the 2018 film Hearts Beat Loud. It premiered at the 2018 Sundance Film Festival, and also played at the 2018 South By Southwest Film Festival. It was released in the US on June 8, 2018.

On July 20, 2020 it was announced that Haley would direct the Grease prequel Summer Lovin'.

Filmography

Film

Television

References

External links

1980s births
Living people
21st-century American male writers
21st-century American male actors
American film editors
People from Key West, Florida
People from Pensacola, Florida
Actors from Illinois
Film directors from Florida
Film directors from Illinois
Film producers from Illinois
Filmmakers from Illinois
Screenwriters from Florida
Screenwriters from Illinois
University of North Carolina alumni
Year of birth missing (living people)
21st-century American screenwriters